Małe Jodło  is a village in the administrative district of Gmina Kunów, within Ostrowiec County, Świętokrzyskie Voivodeship, in south-central Poland.

The village has a population of 173.

References

Villages in Ostrowiec County